Expo '92 is the informal name of the World's Fair held in 1992, which had two sites:

 Seville Expo '92 Universal Exposition in Seville, Spain
 and the minor Genoa Expo '92 International Exposition in Genoa, Italy, opened on May 15, 1992

See also
 Expo 92 motorcycle Grand Prix